Dean DePiero (born September 11, 1968) was the mayor of Parma, Ohio, and a former Cleveland-area member of the Ohio House of Representatives.

Education
Ashland University
Cleveland Marshall College of Law

External links
https://web.archive.org/web/20100203135932/http://www.house.state.oh.us/index.php?option=com_displaymembers&task=detail&district=58

Democratic Party members of the Ohio House of Representatives
Living people
Mayors of places in Ohio
People from Parma, Ohio
1968 births
Ashland University alumni
Cleveland–Marshall College of Law alumni
21st-century American politicians